The Albaviation D24 MagicOne is an Italian ultralight aircraft designed and produced by Albaviation. The company was at one time located in Corropoli, but is now in Montegiorgio. The aircraft is supplied as a kit for amateur construction or complete and ready-to-fly.

Design and development
The D24 MagicOne was designed to comply with the Fédération Aéronautique Internationale microlight rules. It features a strut-braced high-wing, an enclosed cabin with two-seats-in-side-by-side configuration, accessed by doors, fixed tricycle landing gear and a single engine in tractor configuration.

The aircraft is made from aluminum sheet. Its  span wing employs fowler flaps and has a fixed 70% span leading edge slot. Standard engines available are the  Rotax 912ULS,  Jabiru 2200 and the  Jabiru 3300 four-stroke powerplants. With a laminar flow airfoil the design has a high cruise speed for the installed power.

Specifications (D24 MagicOne)

References

External links

D24 MagicOne
2010s Italian ultralight aircraft
Homebuilt aircraft
Single-engined tractor aircraft